Akritas may refer to:

Akritas, Kilkis, a village in the Kilkas regional unit of Greece
Arkitas, Florina, a village in the Florina regional unit of Greece

See also
 
 Akitas
 Akrites